District No. 34 School is a former school building in Denmark Township, Minnesota, United States.  It was built around 1852 and remained in active use until 1946.  It was listed on the National Register of Historic Places in 2014 for its local significance in the theme of education.  It was nominated for being a representative example of the rural one-room schoolhouses of the mid-19th-century.

See also
 National Register of Historic Places listings in Washington County, Minnesota

References

1852 establishments in Minnesota Territory
1946 disestablishments in Minnesota
Defunct schools in Minnesota
Former school buildings in the United States
Greek Revival architecture in Minnesota
National Register of Historic Places in Washington County, Minnesota
One-room schoolhouses in Minnesota
School buildings completed in 1852
School buildings on the National Register of Historic Places in Minnesota
Schools in Washington County, Minnesota